Lord Monson may refer to

Baron Monson, of Burton in the County of Lincolnshire, is a title in the Peerage of Great Britain. It was created in 1728 for Sir John Monson, 5th Baronet.
William Monson, 1st Viscount Monson of Castlemaine in the Peerage of Ireland who lost his title as part of his punishment for his part in the regicide of Charles I.